is a Japanese mathematician, known as, with Peter Orlik and Louis Solomon, a pioneer of the theory of arrangements of hyperplanes. He was awarded a Mathematical Society of Japan Algebra Prize in 2010.

Education
Terao started his studies at the University of Tokyo, where he earned in 1974 his bachelor's degree and in 1976 his master's degree. For his graduate studies he went to Kyoto University, where he earned in 1981 his Ph.D. degree, with a thesis written under the supervision of Kyoji Saito.

Career
He held teaching positions at International Christian University (1977–1991), University of Wisconsin–Madison (1990–1999), Tokyo Metropolitan University (1998–2006), and Hokkaido University (1996–1998, 2006–2015). He was dean of the school of science of Hokkaido University (2013–2015), after which he became  vice president of Hokkaido University (2015–2017). He has been a professor emeritus at Hokkaido University since 2017. He is currently a guest professor at Tokyo Metropolitan University.

Research
In 1983, Terao asked whether the freeness of an arrangement is determined from its intersection lattice. This problem is now known as the Terao conjecture, and is still open.

Books

References

External links
 
 
 Hiroaki Terao's Page

1951 births
Living people
20th-century Japanese mathematicians
21st-century Japanese mathematicians
Academic staff of Hokkaido University
University of Wisconsin–Madison faculty
International Christian University alumni
University of Tokyo alumni
Kyoto University alumni
People from Tokyo
Japanese expatriates in the United States